Levan Saginashvili (born September 15, 1988), nicknamed Georgian Hulk, is a Georgian professional arm-wrestler. He is considered to be the strongest arm wrestler of the modern era and likely of all time. Levan has won the World Arm-wrestling Championship (WAF) seven times, the European arm-wrestling championship six times, and won the Top 8 in 2019, and the World Cup in 2017.

After winning the World Police and Fire Games Gold medal in arm-wrestling in 2013 Belfast, Northern Ireland, UK, he was awarded the merit of first degree by The Ministry of Internal Affairs of Georgia, 2013.

2018 was a very successful year for the arm wrestler, in which he won 3 major tournaments including EuroArm, the World Arm-wrestling Championship and Vendetta All Stars #50, in Rumia, Poland. 

After winning the six-round super-match against Devon Larratt at King of the Table 4 on June 25th 2022, he was presented with the right hand legacy hammer by Devon Larratt and was universally recognized as the world #1 (right arm) arm-wrestler by the community. Levan has stated previously that he intended to win every single round of his professional supermatch career, and was able to uphold this goal from his first supermatch in 2017 until February 2023 when Levan conceded 2 nonessential final rounds against Ermes Gasparini due to health concerns (although still victorious overall).

Levan's continuous dominance has led many athletes, experts, and fans alike to believe that there is no one in the current world of armwrestling who stands a chance at defeating him. There are, however, a small number of athletes who are regarded as having the potential to challenge Levan in the future, possibly most notably Denis Cyplenkov who currently holds the left hand legacy hammer. It remains to be seen whether or not any of them will succeed in taking the spot of world #1 for themselves.

On February 25, 2023, the arm wrestling world was captivated as Levan Saginashvili, the reigning champion and number one arm wrestler on the planet, faced off against Ermes Gasparini at King of the Table 6. Levan had put his legacy hammer and undefeated streak on the line, having won all his preceding super matches with a 6–0 score. Despite his dominance, Levan faced a formidable opponent in Ermes, who had rightfully earned his second-ranked spot with a dominant victory over Dave Chaffee. The match was intense from the start, with Ermes giving Levan a run for his money as he stopped his pins multiple times. There were even moments where it seemed like Ermes could have secured the pin with the flop press, were it not for Levan's elbow fouls. In the end, Levan emerged victorious by winning the first 4 rounds out of a possible 6. However, in the fifth and sixth rounds, he chose not to continue the match due to the previously mentioned health concerns, leading the officials to give the last 2 forfeited rounds to Ermes and end the match on a 4–2 note in favor of Levan. This marked the end of Levan's streak of shutout wins in supermatches, but he still remained unpinned and retained his spot as the number one arm wrestler in the world.

Tournaments

References

1988 births
Living people
Sportspeople from Georgia (country)
Male arm wrestlers